Jesse Tyler Pippy (born August 6, 1982) is an American politician who was elected on November 6, 2018, to serve a 4-year term in the Maryland House of Delegates representing District 4, which encompasses parts of Frederick and Carroll Counties.

Early life and career
Pippy was born August 6, 1982. He grew up in a military family and lived in Europe and Asia. He attended Christopher Newport University, where he earned a B.A. degree in political science and then a J.D. degree at the University of Maryland School of Law.

Pippy first got involved with politics in 2014 when he unsuccessfully ran for the Maryland Senate in District 12. Afterwards, he became the chair of the Frederick County Young Republicans organization. In 2016, he was appointed by Governor Larry Hogan to serve as Commissioner on the Frederick County Board of License Commissioners, succeeding chairman Dick Zimmerman; he was later elected Chairman. Pippy resigned from the liquor board on August 7, 2018.

In August 2017, Pippy filed to run for the Maryland House of Delegates in District 4. He won the general election, receiving 19.7 percent of the vote.

Pippy married his wife, Lindsey May Carpenter, in Frederick, Maryland in 2014. Together, they have two boys.

In the legislature

Pippy was sworn in to the Maryland House of Delegates on January 9, 2019.

In June 2021, Pippy announced he would seek the State Senate seat in District 4 being vacated by Michael Hough, but in September 2021 he withdrew his candidacy. In February 2022, he announced that he would seek re-election to the House of Delegates.

Committee assignments
 Member, Economic Matters Committee, 2021–present (banking, consumer protection & commercial law subcommittee, 2021–present; property & casualty insurance subcommittee, 2021–present; public utilities subcommittee, 2021–present)
 Member, Judiciary Committee, 2019–2020 (juvenile law subcommittee, 2019–2020; public safety subcommittee, 2019–2020)

Other memberships
 Chair, Frederick County Delegation, 2020–2021
 Member, Maryland Legislative Sportsmen's Caucus, 2019
 Maryland Veterans Caucus, 2019–present
 Secretary, Maryland Legislative Latino Caucus, 2019–present
 Chair, Minority Caucus Steering Committee, 2020–present
 Member, Emerging Leaders Program, State Legislative Leaders Foundation, 2020–present

Political positions

Abortion
In March 2022, during a debate on legislation that would expand abortion access, Pippy introduced an amendment that would allow only physicians to provide abortion services. The House of Delegates voted to reject the amendment on a vote of 40-84.

Business
In March 2021, Pippy voted against legislation that would require businesses to create telework policies.

COVID-19 pandemic
In March 2021, Pippy opposed a proposal by Governor Hogan that would give state employees a $1,000 bonus for working during the coronavirus pandemic, saying that he felt the government needed to do more to help private sector employees.

In June 2021, Pippy said that he supported Hogan's decision to end expanded unemployment benefits provided by the American Rescue Plan Act.

In August 2021, Pippy said that he opposed extending Maryland's state of emergency status for the delta variant.

Crime
Pippy introduced legislation in the 2019 legislative session that would recognize human trafficking as a "crime of violence" in Maryland. The bill passed and became law on April 18, 2019. He also introduced legislation that would expand the state's child pornography laws to include lascivious acts and computer-generated images, which passed and became law on April 30, 2019.

Pippy introduced legislation in the 2020 legislative session that would replace the term "gang" with "criminal organization" in the state's criminal law code. The bill passed and became law on May 8, 2020. He also introduced legislation that would make strangulation a first-degree felony assault, which passed and became law on May 8, 2020.

Pippy introduced legislation in the 2021 legislative session that would allow individuals to apply for a court order to obtain information from an electronic device of interest through fax or email. The bill passed and became law on May 30, 2021.

In February 2021, Pippy said that he opposed removing school resource officers from schools.

Healthcare
Pippy introduced legislation in the 2020 legislative session that would fine healthcare facilities that engage in patient brokering.

Immigration
In March 2021, during a debate on legislation that would require counties to end their 287(g) contracts with U.S. Immigration and Customs Enforcement, Pippy unsuccessfully attempted to amend the bill to create exemptions for Frederick County.

Electoral history

References

External links
 
 

Living people
Republican Party members of the Maryland House of Delegates
Politicians from Frederick, Maryland
People from Greenville, North Carolina
Christopher Newport University alumni
1982 births
21st-century American politicians
Hispanic and Latino American state legislators in Maryland